Brimson is an unincorporated community in Ault Township, Saint Louis County, Minnesota, United States.

The community is located 44 miles northeast of the city of Duluth, near the intersection of Saint Louis County Highway 44 and County Road 547 (Brimson Road).  Brimson is located 27 miles northwest of the city of Two Harbors.  Indian Lake and the Cloquet River are both in the vicinity.

The boundary line between Saint Louis and Lake counties is nearby.

Brimson is located within the Cloquet Valley State Forest in Saint Louis County.  The Superior National Forest is also in the vicinity.

Brimson has a volunteer fire department, but it only has access to water hauled by truck since there is no public water system.

The communities of Rollins, Fairbanks, Bassett, Petrel, Toimi, and Wales are all near Brimson.

History
A post office called Brimson has been in operation since 1897. The community was named for W. H. Brimson, a railroad official.

Climate
The Köppen Climate Classification subtype for this climate is "Dfb" (Warm Summer Continental Climate).

References

External links 
 Rand McNally Road Atlas – 2007 edition – Minnesota entry
 Official State of Minnesota Highway Map – 2011/2012 edition

Unincorporated communities in Minnesota
Unincorporated communities in St. Louis County, Minnesota